This is a list of animals found in Malaysia. Malaysia is a humid country, with its rainforests hosting a wide array of animal species. There are around 361 mammals species, 250 reptile species, and 150 frog species found in Malaysia. Approximately 677 bird species are found on Peninsular Malaysia alone (and 694 for Malaysia). Malaysia's marine territory also holds a great diversity of life, with the country's waters being part of the Coral Triangle.

Fauna

Reptiles
 Asian forest tortoise
 Bengal monitor
 Blood python
 Cantor's giant softshell turtle
 Deinagkistrodon
 False gharial
 Green sea turtle
 Hawksbill turtle
 Elongated tortoise
 Leatherback sea turtle
 Ovophis monticola
 Protobothrops sieversorum
 Reticulated python
 Saltwater crocodile
 Siamese crocodile
 Water monitor

Mammals
 Malayan Tiger
Leopard
Elephant 
Panther

Insects
sun bear
Sumatran serow
long-tailed giant rat
Malayan round leaf bat
large flying fox

Birds

Hornbill
Peacock
Porkbill birds

Molluscs

See also

 Wildlife of Malaysia

References

 
Animals
Malaysia